Tommy Avallone is an American film director and producer. He is best known for his work on the documentaries I Am Santa Claus, The Bill Murray Stories: Life Lessons Learned from a Mythical Man and Waldo on Weed.

Life and career
Avallone was born and raised in Haddon Heights, New Jersey and graduated from Haddon Heights High School in 2001. At the age of 20 years he was running for mayor of his hometown.

Avallone's debut feature documentary, I Am Santa Claus, premiered at the Hollywood Film Festival, in 2014. In 2018, he directed the feature documentary, The Bill Murray Stories: Life Lessons Learned from a Mythical Man. It had its international premiere at Hot Docs and was nominated at American Film Festival. In 2019, he directed the feature documentary, Waldo on Weed, premiered at the Tribeca Film Festival, and was nominated at the Philadelphia Film Festival.

In 2021, he directed and co-produced a two-part docuseries on Barney the Dinosaur entitled I Love You, You Hate Me with Scout Productions.  The docuseries will premiere on Peacock on October 12, 2022.

Filmography 

As Actor
 2006 - 24 Hour Diner
 2008 - The Editor
 2008 - Scene In
 2009 - Community College
 2009 - No Footing
 2010 - Living in 8 Bits
 2011 - Our Footloose Remake
 2011 - Miss December
 2012 - Mancation
 2014 - Our RoboCop Remake

References

External links
 
 

American documentary film directors
American documentary film producers
American film directors
American film producers
Haddon Heights Junior/Senior High School alumni
21st-century American male actors
Year of birth missing (living people)
Living people
People from Haddon Heights, New Jersey